Ilie Dancea (born 25 July 1928) was a Romanian weightlifter. He competed in the men's light heavyweight event at the 1952 Summer Olympics.

References

External links

1928 births
Possibly living people
Romanian male weightlifters
Olympic weightlifters of Romania
Weightlifters at the 1952 Summer Olympics
Place of birth missing